The Lincoln and Welland Regiment was an infantry regiment of the Non-Permanent Active Militia of the Canadian Militia (now the Canadian Army). In 1936, the regiment was Amalgamated with The Lincoln Regiment to form a new regiment also under the designation of The Lincoln and Welland Regiment.

Lineage

The Lincoln and Welland Regiment 

 Originated on 16 November 1866, in Clifton, Ontario, as the 44th Welland Battalion of Infantry.
 Redesignated on 1 October 1897, as the 44th Lincoln and Welland Battalion of Infantry.
 Redesignated on 8 May 1900, as the 44th Lincoln and Welland Regiment.
 Redesignated on 1 May 1920, as The Lincoln and Welland Regiment.
 Amalgamated on 15 December 1936, with The Lincoln Regiment to form The Lincoln and Welland Regiment.

Perpetuations 

 98th Battalion (Lincoln & Welland), CEF

Alliances 

  - The Royal Berkshire Regiment (1928-1936)
  - The Hawkes Bay Regiment (Until 1936)

Battle Honours 

 Ypres, 1915, '17
 Festubert, 1915
 Somme, 1916
 Arras, 1917
 Hill 70

Notable Members 

 Brigadier General Frederic William Hill, 
 Brigadier General Ernest Alexander Cruikshank

References

Former infantry regiments of Canada
Lincoln and Welland Regiment
Niagara Falls, Ontario
Military units and formations of Ontario